Hugh II of Saint Omer (ca. 1150–1204) was a Crusader knight and titular Prince of Galilee and Tiberias.

He was the eldest son of Walter of Saint Omer and Eschiva of Bures. After the death of his father in 1174, Eschiva remarried to Raymond III, Count of Tripoli, who thus succeeded Walter as Prince of Galilee. Taken prisoner at the Battle of Marj Ayyun against Saladin in June 1179, he was later ransomed by his mother. In July 1182, he led the forces of Tripoli at the Battle of Belvoir Castle (as Raymond III was ill at the time), helping secure a hard-fought but indecisive victory over Saladin. 

In 1187, the Battle of Hattin signalled the end of the Principality of Galilee, and Raymond of Tripoli died soon after; Hugh thus succeeded to his father's title, but merely as a titular ruler. He married Margaret of Ibelin, daughter of Balian of Ibelin, but the marriage was childless. At his death in 1204, he was succeeded in his title by his brother Raoul of Saint Omerl.

The tale of his imprisonment by Saladin was the inspiration of Ordene de chevalerie, the first work on chivalry.

Notes

Sources
 Etienne Barbazan, L'Ordène de Chevalerie, 1759
 Thomas Delvaux, Le sang des Saint-Omer des croisades à la quenouille, Tatinghem, 2007

1204 deaths
Christians of the Crusades
Princes of Galilee
Saint-Omer family
Year of birth uncertain